Weightlifting was contested at the 2017 Summer Universiade from August 20 to 25 at the Tamkang University Shao-Mo Memorial Gymnasium 7F in New Taipei, Taiwan.

Participating nations 

 (host)

Medal summary

Medal table

Men's events

Women's events

References

External links
2017 Summer Universiade – Weightlifting
Result book – Weightlifting 

 
2017 in weightlifting
2017 Summer Universiade events
Weightlifting at the Summer Universiade